Walchensee Forever is a 2020 German documentary film directed by Janna Ji Wonders. Wonders chronicles the life of four generations of women from her family.

References

External links 

2020 documentary films
German documentary films